USS Victor is a name used more than once by the U.S. Navy:

 , a wooden-hulled motorboat constructed at Camden, New Jersey, by Clement A. Troth, and completed in 1917.
 , a coastal minesweeper laid down in 1941.

United States Navy ship names